
Siedlce County is a unit of territorial administration and local government (powiat) in Masovian Voivodeship, east-central Poland. It came into being on January 1, 1999, as a result of the Polish local government reforms passed in 1998. Its administrative seat is the city of Siedlce, although the city is not part of the county (it constitutes a separate city county).

As of 2019 its total population is 81,265, out of which the population of Mordy is 1,788 and the rural population is 79,477.

Neighbouring counties
Apart from the city of Siedlce, Siedlce County is also bordered by Węgrów County and Sokołów County to the north, Siemiatycze County to the north-east, Łosice County and Biała Podlaska County to the east, Łuków County to the south, Garwolin County to the south-west, and Mińsk County to the west.

Administrative division
The county is subdivided into 13 gminas (one urban-rural and 12 rural). These are listed in the following table, in descending order of population.

References

 
Siedlce